The Essential Simon & Garfunkel is the second 2-CD compilation album of greatest hits by Simon & Garfunkel, released by Columbia Records on October 14, 2003.

This two-disc anthology was released to coincide with Simon & Garfunkel's 2003 reunion tour. It contains all of the duo's 16 singles originally released between 1964 and 1975 to reach the Hot 100 (including the 1975 reunion hit, "My Little Town"). The remaining 17 songs include non-hits like “Richard Cory”, and eight live performances from 1967 to 1969.

Track listing
All songs composed by Paul Simon, except where noted.

US version
Disc one

Disc two

Disc three (3.0 edition)
 1 He Was My Brother	
 2	April Come She Will 	
 3 7 O'Clock News/Silent Night
 4	Punky's Dilemma 
 5	Why Don't You Write Me	
 6	Citizen of the Planet

European version
Disc one

Disc two

Charts

Weekly charts

Year-end charts

Certifications

References

Simon & Garfunkel compilation albums
2003 greatest hits albums
Albums produced by Bob Johnston
Albums produced by Paul Simon
Albums produced by Tom Wilson (record producer)
Albums produced by Roy Halee
Albums produced by Art Garfunkel
Albums produced by Phil Ramone
Albums produced by John Simon (record producer)